Sturminster Newton is a town in Dorset, England.

Sturminster Newton may also refer to the following things associated with it:

 Sturminster Newton High School
 Sturminster Newton Hundred, the ancient administrative area based on the town
 Sturminster Newton railway station
 Sturminster Newton United F.C.